Mir-Hossein Mousavi Khameneh (born 2 March 1942) is an Iranian reformist politician, opposition of Ali Khamenei the Supreme Leader of Iran, artist and architect who served as the 49th and last Prime Minister of Iran from 1981 to 1989. He was a reformist candidate for the 2009 presidential election and eventually the leader of the opposition in the post-election unrest. Mousavi served as the president of the Iranian Academy of Arts until 2009, when Conservative authorities removed him. Although Mousavi had always considered himself a reformist (and not an opposition) and believed in reforming the Islamic Regime within the 1979 Revaluation constitution, on 3 Feb 2023 in a big change of opinion and after 4 months of violent suppression of Iranian People by Ali Khamenei, the Supreme Leader of Iran, he announced that "he no longer supports the current Islamic Republic constitution", and asked for a widespread referendum to fully change the constitution and make a fundamental change in Iran's political system.

In the early years of the revolution, Mousavi was the editor-in-chief of Jomhouri-e Eslami, the official newspaper of the Islamic Republican Party, before being elevated to Minister of Foreign Affairs and eventually the post of Prime Minister. He was the last Prime Minister in Iran prior to the 1989 constitutional changes which removed the post of the prime minister; he then went into semi-retirement for the next 20 years. He remains a member of the Expediency Discernment Council and the High Council of Cultural Revolution. However, he has not participated in their meetings for years, which is interpreted by political analysts and commentators as a sign of his disapproval.

For the 2009 Iranian Presidential election, Mousavi came out of semi-retirement and ran as one of two Reformist candidates against the administration of incumbent President of Iran Mahmoud Ahmadinejad. According to official results, he didn't win the election, and following alleged vote-rigging and manipulation, his campaign sparked a long protest that eventually turned into a national and international movement against the Government and Supreme Leader Ali Khamenei. Despite the violent crackdown, he remains the leader of the Green Movement but his movements have remained severely restricted. He chose green as his campaign color, a color which is pervasive in Iran. He is currently under house arrest along with his wife Zahra Rahnavard and Mehdi Karroubi.

Early life, education, and career
Seyyed Mir-Hossein Mousavi was born on 2 March 1942 in Khameneh, East Azerbaijan, Iran. He is an ethnic Azerbaijani, whose family originated from Tabriz. His father, Mir-Ismail, was a tea merchant from Tabriz. Mousavi grew up in Khameneh, and moved to Tehran following his graduation from high school in 1958. Mousavi is a relative of fellow Khameneh native Ali Khamenei: Mousavi's grandmother is Khamenei's paternal aunt.

He earned his undergraduate degree in architecture from the National University of Tehran (now Shahid Beheshti University),  and in 1969 was awarded his master's degree in architecture from the National University of Tehran, focusing primarily on traditional Iranian architecture. While a student, he was an active member of the leftist Islamic association of students. During his college years, Mousavi had a close relationship with the Freedom Movement of Iran, a religious-nationalist political party founded by Ali Shariati, whom Mousavi admired for many years. Although the party would not be invited to the post-revolution government, many future political leaders of Iran who were affiliated with the party at the time, among them Mehdi Bazargan, Yadolah Sahabi, Mahmoud Taleghani, and Mostafa Chamran would become Mousavi's closest allies. Mousavi was among the student activists who regularly attended Ali Shariati's lectures at Hosseiniyeh Ershad of Tehran, where Mousavi also exhibited his artwork under the pseudonym Hossein Rah'jo.

In 1969, Mousavi married Zahra Rahnavard, a fellow university student who specialized in sculpture, and was among the well-known students of Ali Shariati. Rahnavard later became the Chancellor of Alzahra University as well as political adviser to Iran's former President Mohammad Khatami. The couple have three daughters; all speak Azeri, Persian, English, and Arabic.

Iranian Revolution

Mousavi and his wife had an active role in the success of the Iranian Revolution. He was imprisoned for organizing street protests against the monarchy of Shah Mohammad Reza Pahlavi. As the Iranian Revolution neared, Mousavi, whose earliest political hero was Che Guevara, became more actively involved in the struggle. He initially participated in the establishment of the Jonbesh-e Mosalmanan-e Mobarez (Movement of Militant Muslims) alongside Habibollah Peyman which eventually led him to join ranks with Mohammad Beheshti, who was a close associate of the revolution leader, Ruhollah Khomeini, and abandoned his previous connections with Ali Shariati.

Following the collapse of the Shah's regime in 1979, Mousavi helped Mohammad Beheshti found the Islamic Republican Party in 1979 in order to assist the establishment of the Islamic republic in Iran and hasten the overthrow of Iran's monarchy. He became the political secretary of the party, and chief editor of Jomhouri-e Eslami, the party's official newspaper. For this, he is widely viewed as "The Architect" of the Islamic Republic both in Iran and abroad.

In mid-1979, he was appointed by Khomeini to the Council of the Islamic Revolution. As the chief editor of Jomhouri-e Eslami, he was a loud critic and opponent of Abolhassan Banisadr, the first president of the Islamic Republic, until the latter's 1981 flight to France, following a successful impeachment by parliament. During Banisadr's presidency, the prime minister Mohammad Ali Rajai nominated Mousavi as his foreign minister, however Banisadr opposed the nomination and Mousavi was not appointed.  On 15 August 1981, as part of the restructuring of the government in Rajai's cabinet, Mousavi was appointed foreign minister. He held the post until 15 December 1981, when he received the higher appointment of prime minister.

Prime ministership

In August 1981, President Mohammad-Ali Rajai and Prime Minister Mohammad-Javad Bahonar were assassinated in an explosion. Ali Khamenei was then elected as the third President of Iran in the October 1981 Iranian presidential election. He put forward Ali Akbar Velayati as his prime minister, but the Iranian parliament did not give him the vote of confidence, and he was defeated with a vote of 80 to 74. Although Khamenei had strong reservations with Mousavi, as a compromise with the left-leaning parliament, agreed to offer Mousavi for the post of premier. On 28 October 1981, with the approval of Khomeini, the parliament approved Mousavi with a vote of 115 to 39 to become the 79th prime minister of Iran on 31 October 1981.

The conflicts between Mousavi, who belonged to the left wing of the Islamic Republic, with Ali Khamenei (the current leader of Iran), who belonged to the right wing of the Islamic Republic, continued during their eight years of shared governance. However, an escalation in conflicts between the two led to Mousavi's resignation shortly after the end of the Iran–Iraq War in 1988. As the prime minister, Mousavi had the full backing of Ruhollah Khomeini, the supreme leader, and he refused to accept his resignation. While his government was viewed as somewhat liberal, he was still under the pressure of hardliners, though Khomeini generally protected Mousavi from the conservatives and gave him a free rein in deciding actions for the economy. However, his involvement in security matters remained less clear, and it was disputed whether or not Mousavi was involved in the killing of thousands of dissidents and minorities in Kurdistan and Mazandaran during this time. It has generally been accepted that Mousavi and Mohsen Rezaee (who was in charge of the Revolutionary Guards during this time) have never been close, though he was in charge of foreign operations, particularly in Lebanon.

Mousavi's premiership coincided with the Iran–Iraq War. He guided the country through its war with Iraq, and earned popular acclaim for his stewardship of the national economy. He pioneered a bond-based economy, which many believe was responsible for a fair distribution of goods among the people throughout the Iran–Iraq War. Many analysts praise his handling of Iran's economy, his civil and economic leadership during the Iran–Iraq War, and his efforts to end Iran's international isolation. Others remember him as being "unpredictable" and less able to navigate Iran's labyrinthine political system than were his rivals. In 1986, Mousavi played a great role in the Iran–Contra affair and secret negotiations and dealing with USA on helping them free the American hostages in Lebanon, in return for sale of the American weapons and spare-parts that Iran's army badly needed for the Iran–Iraq War.

A year after the end of the Iran–Iraq War on 20 August 1988, Ruhollah Khomeini died (June 3, 1989), and Ali Khamenei was elected as the new Supreme Leader by the Assembly of Experts. Following his death, Mousavi and his fellow left-wingers lost their main source of support within the establishment. During the parliament hearing on post-war reconstruction plans, Mousavi had heated arguments with Ali Akbar Hashemi Rafsanjani, the speaker of Iran's parliament at the time, over Rafsanjani's suggestion that Iran accept the offer of western countries to help with post-war reconstruction.

On 28 July 1989, the constitution was amended and approved by Iranian voters in a national referendum with a 97% yes vote. At this time, Mehdi Karrubi had been elected as the new speaker of the parliament, to whom the amended constitution was declared. One of these amendments abolished the position of Prime Minister. Rafsanjani was elected as the fourth president of Iran on 28 July 1989, and became the president on 3 August 1989. Mousavi's premiership ended on the same date. Mousavi was not invited to be a participant in the new government headed by Rafsanjani, and disappeared from the public sphere.

Early stance on pre-revolutionary icons 
Some pre-revolutionary filmmakers have accounts about celebrities who have been hurt by Mousavi's positions in his early years in office. Saeed Motalebi, an established writer and director in the pre-revolutionary era, has one of such accounts that refers to the 1982 film The Imperilled (Barzakhi-ha) which was written by him and had four pre-revolutionary male stars in the lead roles. It was directed by Iraj Ghaderi and, with its patriotic story about resisting foreign invasion, it was a chance for Fardin, Malek-Motiei, Ghaderi and Rad to renew their threatened careers as actors in the post-revolutionary atmosphere. The film was a hit and became the highest grossing Iranian film of all time in its short period of screening in theaters. But it was soon banned and consequently the four actors were banned from working. About how the film's success was turned into disaster Motalebi says: In one friday Mr. Mohsen Makhmalbaf gathered a couple of people and they started collecting signatures for a petition which was written on a scroll, stating that "We have made a revolution while these actors are transgressors." They did it right in front of that theater in the Revolution Square near the university of Tehran. They said "Look how theaters are crowded while friday events are deserted." That's how they stopped my film.
Then a reporter who was queued to ask something about our film, went and told the then prime minister (Mir-Hossein Mousavi) "There is a film in theaters whose writer wants to convey that people who are fighting in the fronts are problematic persons." The prime minister replied "These are leftovers of junk intellectuals who will soon go to the dustbin of history." Malek-Motiei became jobless and turned his garage into a pastry shop. Ghaderi put some rice bags in his office and became a rice dealer. Fardin opened a pastry shop too and when I went to visit him, I used to wait outside as long as there were no customers so that he wouldn't feel ashamed when he saw me. These were all caused by those illogical efforts which I will never forgive.

1988 prison massacres 
On 12 December 2018 Amnesty International published an interview of the Austrian national public service ORF (broadcaster), on 13 December 1988, with Mir Hossein Mousavi. Mousavi was asked about the mass executions inside Iran's prison at the time he was in office. Mousavi replied, “We repressed them”. Amnesty's report criticizes Mousavi's response asserting that “without explaining what he is acknowledging ... he focuses on criticizing the July 1988 armed incursion by the People’s Mojahedin Organization of Iran (PMOI).” The report goes on to say:
Since 2009, when he re-entered politics as a Reformist opposition leader, Mir Hossein Mousavi’s response when asked about the 1988 prison massacres has often been to avoid commenting or to claim that they took place without the knowledge of his government. In this way, he has tried to justify his failure to stop, investigate or at least condemn the killings publicly. However, documents from Amnesty International’s archives show that the organization repeatedly raised its concerns about reports of mass prisoner executions with senior officials in Mir Hossein Mousavi’s government.

Retirement from politics

When Khomeini, the founder of the Islamic Republic, died in 1989, Mousavi was no longer welcome in the government. It was the start of 20 years of an almost total absence from public life for Mousavi, which many considered as a sign of his disapproval of the established government, though he did sit on two high-level government councils.

In 1989, Ali Khamenei named him as a member of the Expediency Discernment Council, his membership of which still continues. Mousavi has been a member of the Supreme Council of Cultural Revolution since 1996. He was also the political adviser of president Hashemi Rafsanjani (1989–1997) and senior adviser of president Khatami (1997–2005).

During these years, he partly retired from politics and returned to architecture and teaching, becoming President of the Iranian Academy of Arts, one of the four academies of the Islamic Republic of Iran. The main building of the Academy is designed by him. At the same time, he developed his passion for painting and writing poetry. He was a professor at Shahid Beheshti University and later joined the Academic staff of Tarbiat Modares University. His main field is architecture, and buildings such as Kanoon-e Tohid in Tehran, Beynolharamein Bazaar in Shiraz, Haft-e-tir Martyr's tomb in Tehran's Behesht-e Zahra, and Salman mosque in the presidential residence are examples of his work. In recent years, he has been more active in painting and has participated in many exhibitions.

Presidential candidacy

Pre-2009
Mousavi refused to run for the presidency in the 1997 elections, which caused the reformists to turn to his former Cabinet Minister, then a little-known cleric, Mohammad Khatami, who was elected by a landslide. During Khatami's administration, Mousavi served as the Senior Adviser to the President.

Mousavi was considered the leading candidate from the reformist alliance to run in the 2005 Iranian presidential election. However, on 12 October 2004, he officially declined the proposal after a meeting with President Mohammad Khatami and the two other top members of one of Iran's main Reformist parties, the Association of Combatant Clerics, Mehdi Karroubi and Mohammad Mousavi-Khoiniha.

2009 presidential candidacy

After 20 years of political silence, on 9 March 2009, Mousavi announced his intention to run in the 2009 Iranian presidential election. He stated that his main goals were: to institutionalize social justice, equality and fairness, freedom of expression, to root out corruption and to speed up Iran's stagnant process of privatization, and thus move Iran away from what he called "an alms-based economy". Mousavi criticized the then-current conservative President, Mahmoud Ahmadinejad, for his alleged economic mismanagement, asking, when Iran "was making profits from the high prices of oil, did he (Ahmadinejad) envisage a situation when the prices would fall?" On 16 March 2009, the former Iranian President Khatami withdrew from the election in support of Mir-Hossein Mousavi.

Platform
Mousavi ran as an independent Principled Reformist candidate. Although he is one of the original founders of the Iranian reformist camp, he shares many principles of the conservatives. Many reformist parties, among them reformist Islamic Iranian Participation Front, whose main candidate was Khatami, have supported his candidacy after the latter withdrew from the race. Many supporters of the reformist movement, however, objected to Mousavi's candidacy on the grounds that he was not committed to the principles of the reformist parties. Although Mousavi stated that he was not running as a reformist, he indicated that he welcomed the support of different parties, both reformist and conservative. He started his campaign from the center of Iranian politics; over time, he shifted more towards the left by declaring his support for reforms. Although some active members of the conservative camp, such as Emad Afroogh, as well as the conservative newspaper Jomhouri-e Eslami, supported Mousavi's candidacy, he did not receive the official backing of any major conservative party. His candidacy made it harder for the conservatives to support Mahmoud Ahmadinejad, and large conservative parties, such as the Combatant Clergy Association, did not back the current President for a second term of office.

Domestic policies

Mousavi had on numerous occasions indicated his wish to change the constitution in order to remove the existing ban on the private ownership of television stations (currently all Iranian television stations are state-owned), as well as transfer the control of the law-enforcement forces to the President (so that they represent the people, since the people directly elect the President through popular vote) from the Supreme Leader. He said that "the issue of non-compliance with the Iranian rules and regulations is the biggest problem that the country is currently faced with" and that he wished to put in place ways to enforce the laws further, and that it was also important to bring an end to keeping the populace uninformed about government matters. Among his policies were creation of a free environment for the flow of information and corrections to the national budget. He wanted to promote the creation of private, non-governmental TV networks and stop the operation of the "Moral Police". He has spoken about his opposition to massive changes in ministries, which he claims is what Ahmadinejad has done.

The BBC reported that Mousavi "called for greater personal freedoms in Iran and criticized the ban on private television channels", but "refused to back down from the country's disputed nuclear programme, saying it was "for peaceful purposes".  Regarding the Iranian nuclear program, his plan includes a reduction of the cost by opposing radical approaches while maintaining what he sees as "Iran's right to civilian nuclear technology". Mousavi has stated that giving up the country's nuclear program would be "irreparable" and that the Iranian people support the nuclear program. "No one in Iran will accept suspension,"  Mousavi has said, adding that if elected, his policy would be to work to provide "guarantees" that Tehran's nuclear activities would never divert to non-peaceful aims.

On 30 May, Mousavi pledged that if elected he would amend "discriminatory and unjust regulations" against women, and take other measures in favour of women's rights and equality. He said that he would seek to disband the so-called morality police force, and ensure that Iranian women are treated equally, with the ability to attain financial empowerment and to serve at the highest levels of decision making bodies.

Foreign policies
Mousavi directly addressed activating foreign policy to boost national interest by reducing tensions with other nations. This included negotiating with U.S. President Barack Obama if "his actions are in keeping with his words". He condemned Ahmadinejad's attitude toward The Holocaust (namely, that it was "a myth"), and condemned the killing of Jews in the Holocaust.

Protests to the election results

The election was held on 12 June 2009. The official results showed Ahmadinejad winning by a landslide, though Mousavi and many others believed the results to be fraudulent, suggesting that the Interior Minister, Sadegh Mahsouli, an ally of Ahmadinejad, interfered with the election and distorted the votes to keep Ahmadinejad in power. Mousavi has claimed victory, and called for his supporters to celebrate it, sparking large protests as a result.

Due to protests, from the opposition, the Supreme Leader ordered a partial recount of the election results. The recount was a random counting of 10% of the ballots. In order to create transparency, a 12-member council showed the recount on television, and concluded that President Ahmadinejad still led Mousavi after the recount. After the recount, the Guardian council certified the election, and concluded no evidence of irregularities, and closed the dossier on the election.

Beginning of the Green Movement

The Iranian Green Movement refers to a series of actions after the Iranian presidential election in 2009, in which protesters demanded the removal of Mahmoud Ahmadinejad from office.

Mousavi, Mehdi Karroubi, Hossein-Ali Montazeri and Mohammad Khatami are recognized as leaders of the Green Movement. Where is my vote? was a motto used during the protests. Anti-Ahmadinejad protesters chanted the English-language phrase in numbers not seen since the 1979 Iranian Revolution, in an attempt to receive international attention. The Iranian Government had released results claiming a two-thirds majority for Ahmadinejad, but supporters of Mousavi and Karroubi, the moderate opposition leaders, accused the government of rigging the vote.

In the aftermath of the election and ensuing comments by Ahmadinejad and other conservative leaders, calling the opposition "a pile of dust" (خس و خاشاک), protests were widened and massive peaceful protests were held around the country. Although the Iranian government prohibited any gatherings of protesters in Tehran and across the country, significantly slowed down internet access, and censored any form of media supporting the opposition, hundreds of thousands of Iranians marched in defiance. Large numbers of protesters were arrested, and several were killed by the police and militia forces Basij. Neda Agha-soltan and Sohrab Aarabi were among the victims, and alleged cases of rape in prison (Taraneh Mousavi) were also uncovered.

Since the election, the government has severely restricted the access of foreign and Iranian media to footage and information relating to opposition activities. As a result, scenes of the massive street protests and more frequent student protests have been filmed by participants themselves.

Death of Mousavi's nephew
Seyed Ali Mousavi was the nephew of Mousavi. Ali Mousavi died on 27 December 2009, during the 2009 Iranian election protests, when he was reportedly shot in either the back or the chest by security forces during demonstrations against Mahmoud Ahmadinejad's contested election win.

Iranian filmmaker Mohsen Makhmalbaf, the official spokesman of Mir-Hossein Moussavi's campaign abroad, told BBC News in an interview that Iranian secret police had called Seyed Ali Mousavi several times, days before he was shot, saying: "We will kill you."

After he died, his body was taken to Ebn-e Sina hospital, where protesters demonstrated outside. The protesters were broken up with tear gas by the Iranian security forces. It was later revealed that the government had removed his body and taken it to an undisclosed location in an attempt to crack down on the protests.

The Green Path of Hope
Mousavi and other reformist leaders are now working with peaceful and legal methods to widen the influence of their reforms. They have set up a new coalition, named The Green Path of Hope. Iranian political parties and movements need to be authorized by the Interior Ministry. Mousavi neither recognizes the current government as legitimate, nor is likely to receive permission; the movement was named a "path" in order bypass this law.

The Green Path of Hope seeks to continue protests against Ahmadinejad's presidency following lawful and peaceful methods, and the full execution of the constitution, as Mousavi says:

Mousavi is quoted in describing the movement:

According to organization officials, the movement encompasses numerous political parties, NGOs and social networks. Mousavi emphasized that existent, autonomous social networks in the community are part of this movement:

The "Green Path" has six main members on its central council, who are connected to reformist parties, NGOs, and social networks. The main body will be ordinary protesters. The strategy is to connect existent pressures and issues in society in a social network, and to therefore lead protests in a lawful manner.

Arab Spring

In the wake of the Tunisian and Egyptian revolutions, Green movement leaders in Iran called for demonstrations on 14 February 2011. The government responded by placing leaders of the movement under house arrest, and on 14 February Iranian state TV broadcast images of "some 50 conservative MPs marching through parliament's main hall" chanting "Death to Mousavi, death to Karroubi".

House arrest

Mousavi and his wife, as well as Mehdi Karoubi, another opposition figure, were put under house arrest after they urged their supporters to organize demonstrations in support of uprisings in the Arab world in February 2011. On 2 February 2013, Iran's security forces arrested Mousavi's two daughters, Zahra and Nargess Mousavi, in their home. The semi-official news agency ILNA reported that they were questioned, and then freed the same day. After the election of Hassan Rouhani as President in 2013, it was announced that Mousavi and Rahnavard would soon be freed from house arrest.

In 2019, Mousavi was given the right to exit his home once a week. In addition, his immediate family were also able to visit him anytime. They were also given permission to use a mobile phone and satellite television.

However, he is still under house arrest.

Political and academic posts
 Member of Central Campaign of Islamic Republican Party (1979–1981)
 Head of Political Office of Islamic Republican Party (1980–1981)
 Editor-in-Chief of Islamic Republican Newspaper (1981)
 Minister of Foreign Affairs (1981)
 President of Council of Cultural Revolution (1981)
 Prime Minister of Iran (1981–1989)
 President of Mostazafen Foundation of Islamic Revolution (1981–1989)
 President of Economy Council (1982–1989)
 Political adviser of president Hashemi Rafsanjani (1989–1997)
 Senior adviser of President Khatami (1997–2005)
 Member of Expediency Discernment Council (1989–2012)
 Member of Supreme Council of Cultural Revolution (1996–2012)
 President of Iranian Academy of Arts (2000–2009)
 Leader of Green Movement and The Green Path of Hope (2009– )

See also

References

Further reading

External links

 Official site 
 "The Political Evolution of Mousavi", Tehran Bureau on PBS Frontline, 16 February 2010

|-

|-

 
1942 births
Al-Moussawi family
Candidates for President of Iran
Council of the Islamic Revolution members
Foreign ministers of Iran
Iranian architects
Iranian journalists
Iranian painters
Iranian revolutionaries
Iranian democracy activists
Iranian Green Movement
Iranian newspaper publishers (people)
Iranian prisoners and detainees
Iranian reformists
Central Council of the Islamic Republican Party members
Living people
Members of the Expediency Discernment Council
Movement of Militant Muslims politicians
People from East Azerbaijan Province
People of the Iranian Revolution
Presidential advisers of Iran
Prime Ministers of Iran
People who have been placed under house arrest in Iran
Iranian people of the Iran–Iraq War
Heads of government who were later imprisoned
Shahid Beheshti University alumni
Academic staff of Shahid Beheshti University
Academic staff of Tarbiat Modares University
Political prisoners in Iran